A Grounding in Numbers is the eleventh studio album by the British rock group Van der Graaf Generator. It was released on 14 March 2011. This date, if written as 3,14, comprises the first three digits of the number π. The second track, "Mathematics", refers to Euler's identity, sometimes known as the mathematical poem. The album's release signals a continuation in the direction set by the current trio lineup, but it is released on a new label, Esoteric Recordings, a departure from previous releases on Virgin/Charisma. Hugh Padgham is the mixer of the album.

Background 
Preparations for the work on the new album began in late 2008 and early 2009, when the band members started gathering song fragments and exchanging "ideas, theories, policies and directions". In April 2010 the band met up for intensive sessions in Cornwall where the whole album was arranged, rehearsed and recorded in the course of one week. Over the next months the tracks were overdubbed, edited and adapted by the band members (who were continuing to exchange files over the internet or on CD-R) in their own studios. By September 2010 the material was ready to be mixed and at that point Hugh Padgham was approached. After three weeks in his London studio, Sofasound, the album was completed.

Track listing 
All songs by Hugh Banton, Guy Evans and Peter Hammill.

 "Your Time Starts Now" – 4:15
 "Mathematics" – 3:38
 "Highly Strung" – 3:36
 "Red Baron" (instrumental) – 2:23
 "Bunshō" – 5:03
 "Snake Oil" – 5:21
 "Splink" (instrumental) – 2:37
 "Embarrassing Kid" – 3:07
 "Medusa" – 2:12
 "Mr. Sands" – 5:22
 "Smoke" –  2:30
 "5533" – 2:42
 "All Over the Place" – 6:04

Personnel 
Van der Graaf Generator 
 Peter Hammill – voice, piano, electric guitar (and Ashbory bass on "Splink")
 Hugh Banton – organs (including bass pedals), bass guitar (and harpsichord, piano, glockenspiel, 10 string bass, guitar on "Smoke")
 Guy Evans – drums, percussion (and guitar on "5533")

References

External links 
 A Grounding In Numbers at vandergraafgenerator.co.uk
 Peter Hammill's newsletter detailing the making of the album (accessed 1-1-2011)
 Van der Graaf Generator: A Grounding in Numbers review at All About Jazz
 Van der Graaf Generator – A Grounding in Numbers (2011) album releases & credits at Discogs.com
 Van der Graaf Generator – A Grounding in Numbers (2011) album to be listened as stream at Spotify.com

Van der Graaf Generator albums
2011 albums
Esoteric Recordings albums